Tymon Park is a large suburban public park in Dublin, Ireland. One of Dublin's historically important rivers, the River Poddle passes through it, providing water to a number of ponds.

Location 
The park is situated between Tallaght, Templeogue and Walkinstown. It straddles the M50 motorway which divides the park in two. A pedestrian footbridge links the eastern and western sides near Greenhills Road, with another further south near Templeogue Road. There are four main entrances which provide access to car parks at Tymon North Road, Greenhills Road, Limekiln Road and Willington Lane. In addition, pedestrians can gain access through a number of smaller gates.

Amenities and activities
The River Poddle flows through the park, filling two bigger lakes and several interconnecting smaller ponds or water features. Four stands of mixed deciduous woodland have been established, the predominant tree species being beech, poplar, ash, horse chestnut, willow, maples, sycamore and birch, with alder, hazel, and hawthorn near the edges. The water bodies attract waterfowl, and other habitats include waterside, hedgerow, grassland and wasteland.

There is a children's adventure playground at the western end of the park, close to the Greenhills Road entrance. A new playground has been constructed close to the South Dublin County Council (SDCC) depot beside Castletymon Road. Other playgrounds are located beside the Willington Lane car park and at the Limekiln Road car park.

Tymon Park is commonly used for walking, jogging and field sports.  The park contains 29 pitches for soccer, gaelic football, hurling, etc.  There are also a number of waymarked woodland trails with interpretations of woodland features provided. 

A 5 km Parkrun takes place in Tymon Park each Saturday morning. As of 29 March 2020, when the event was suspended due to the COVID-19 pandemic, there had been 298 runs with an average of 133.5 runners per week.

References

Parks in South Dublin (county)
Tallaght
Templeogue
Kimmage
American football venues in the Republic of Ireland